This is a list of episodes from the third and final season of Tour of Duty, along with episode summaries.

Production

Cast
 Terence Knox as Clayton Ezekiel "Zeke" Anderson
 Stephen Caffrey as Myron Goldman
 Tony Becker as Daniel "Danny" Purcell
 Stan Foster as Marvin Johnson
 Ramón Franco as Alberto Ruiz
 Miguel A. Núñez Jr. as Marcus Taylor
 Dan Gauthier as John McKay
 John Dye as Francis "Doc Hock" Hockenberry
 Kim Delaney as Alex Devlin (2 episodes)
 Carl Weathers as Colonel Carl Brewster
 Kyle Chandler as William Griner
 Lee Majors as Thomas "Pop" Scarlett
 Patrick Kilpatrick as Duke Fontaine
 Michael B. Christy as Major Duncan
 Charles Hyman as Sgt Marion Hannegan
 Alan Scarfe as Colonel Stringer
 Peter Vogt as General Elliott
 Greg Germann as Lt. Joseph Beller
 Maria Mayenzet as Sister Bernadette
 Michael Fairman as General Higgins
 Betsy Brantley as Jennifer Seymour (1 episode)
 Eric Bruskotter as Scott Baker (1 episode)
 Don Borza as Griff (1 episode)

Crew
Producers:
 Zev Braun - Executive Producer

Writers:
 L. Travis Clark (21 episodes)
 Steve Duncan (21 episodes)
 Robert Bielak (4 episodes)
 Brian Herskowitz (1 episode)

Directors:
 Jim Johnston (4 episodes)
 George Kaczender (3 episodes)
 Bradford May (3 episodes)
 Stephen L. Posey (3 episodes)
 James A. Contner (2 episodes)
 Randy Roberts (1 episode)
 Edwin Sherin (1 episode)
 Paul Lynch (1 episode)
 Helaine Head (1 episode)
 Steve Dubin (1 episode)
 Stephen Caffrey (1 episode)

Episodes

References

External links
 Tour of Duty at IMDb
 Tour of Duty at hum90.com

Tour of Duty (TV series) seasons
1989 American television seasons
1990 American television seasons